Kristína Kučová was the defending champion, but did not compete in the juniors that year.

CoCo Vandeweghe won the tournament, defeating Gabriela Paz in the final, 7–6(7–3), 6–1.

Seeds

Draw

Finals

Top half

Section 1

Section 2

Bottom half

Section 3

Section 4

External links 
 Draw

Girls' Singles
US Open, 2008 Girls' Singles